Kunchacko Boban (born 2 November 1976) is an Indian actor and film producer. Sometimes referred to as Chackochan, he works in the Malayalam film industry and has acted in more than 90 films in more than two decades. He is a member of the Kunchacko family. Kunchacko's debut was as a child in the film Dhanya (1981) produced by his father Boban Kunchacko.

He debuted as an adult leading role in Fazil's 1997 romantic drama Aniyathipraavu opposite Shalini, which became the highest-grossing Malayalam film till then, establishing him as a bankable actor overnight. He appeared in a brief role in Harikrishnans (1998) starring Mohanlal and Mammootty, which was the top Malayalam box office grosser of the year. Kunchacko and Shalini joined again in successful romantic films Nakshatratharattu (1998) and Niram (1999) and Prem Poojari. Niram was one of the highest-grossing Malayalam films of the year. By then he had created a "romantic hero" image in Malayalam cinema, nevertheless, he also had success in other genres, as a villager in Narendran Makan Jayakanthan Vaka (2001) and as a son to a debt-ridden family in  Kasthooriman (2003). His career took a setback after few box office failures during the mid-2000s. He took a break from films in 2006 and moved on to business.

He came back in 2009 with the comedy Gulumal: The Escape, a commercial success. After his comeback, Kunchacko completely changed his chocolate boy and romantic hero image and he proved his versatility as an actor by doing various different roles. In the comeback, he raised his stardom with commercially successful films and reestablished himself as one of the popular lead actors of Mollywood. His roles in critically and commercially acclaimed films like Traffic, How Old Are You?, Take off, Vettah, Virus, Nayattu, Pada and Nna Thaan Case Kodu was widely appreciated. He is also known for his dancing skills.

In 2016, Kunchacko produced the comedy drama film Kochavva Paulo Ayyappa Coelho through Udaya Studios, in the process of reviving the studio after a 30-year hiatus.

He hails from the Udaya family, which is considered the ancestral home of the Malayalam film industry. Kunchacko Boban has announced the movie 'Ariyippu' under the banner of Udaya Studios at the occasion of his Silver Jubilee celebration as hero and Platinum Jubilee celebration of Udaya Pictures. He also launched another production house, Kunchacko Boban Productions, debuting with the movie Ariyippu.

Early life and family

Kunchacko Boban (also known as Chackochan) was born  a Syro Malabar Catholic in  Alappuzha, Kerala. He hails from the Maliampurakal family, who is credited with owning the first film studio in Kerala, Udaya Studios; his great grandfather, Maliampurakal Mani Chacko, started the first boat service in Kuttanadu.

He is the grandson of legendary film producer Kunchacko, who established Udaya Studios. He is the grandnephew of Navodaya Appachan of Navodaya Studios. Boban is a relative of Jijo Punnose, also a film director.

His father, Boban Kunchacko, was also an actor, director, and producer who was part of a few films produced by Udaya. Kunchacko's mother Molly is a housewife and he has two younger sisters, Anu and Minu.

He graduated with first-class in B.Com from Sanatana Dharma College in 1997. Being a sports enthusiast, he plays various games like cricket, table tennis, basketball and badminton, with badminton being the one he is best at. He was trained Bharatanatyam in his childhood time.

Personal life
Kunchacko Boban married a fan of his, Priya Ann Samuel, on April 2, 2005, at Little Flower Syro Malabar Catholic Church, Ernakulam. They became parents to a boy, Izahaak Boban Kunchacko, on April 16, 2019. His son's baptism took place on 30 June 2019 and the event was attended by prominent personalities in the Malayalam film industry.

Acting career

1997–2006
Kunchacko Boban was introduced into the Malayalam film industry by versatile director Fazil. His debut film, Aniathipravu (1997), co-starring Shalini, and directed by Fazil, turned out to be the highest-grossing Malayalam film ever and Kunchacko Boban's performance as Sudhi, the lead character was well received by young audiences and families. The Kunchacko Boban - Shalini pair was considered one of the best star pairs of the Malayalam film industry.|

Following the success of Aniathipravu, Kunchacko Boban was cast in hit films such as Nakshathrathaarattu (1998), Mayilpeelikkavu (1998) and Niram (1999), which was among 1999's highest-grossing Malayalam films and songs of "Niram" are still very popular. The actor reunited with his debut film's director Fazil in Harikrishnans, where he played a cameo, which marked the reunion of Mohanlal and Mammootty after nine years and it was the highest-grossing Malayalam film of the year.| Then he appeared in commercially successful films such as Priyam (2000), Sathyam Sivam Sundaram (2000), Dosth (2001), Narendran Makan Jayakanthan Vaka (2001) and Kalyanaraman (2002).

In 2005, after his marriage, he took a break from films.

2008–present
Kunchacko Boban returned to films in 2008 with a special appearance in a song in Twenty:20 and later acted in Shafi's LollyPop. His real comeback was in 2009 with comedy film Gulumal: The Escape, directed by popular ad filmmaker and director V. K. Prakash. Gulumal was followed by a string of successful films which established him as one of the most successful actors of the last decade and he made a complete makeover of his screen image in his comeback.

In 2010 he played the lead role in the films such as Jeethu Joseph's Mummy & Me, Sakudumbam Shyamala and Lal Jose's Elsamma Enna Aankutty, all of which were commercial successes and reviewers praised Kunchacko Boban for his performance in Elsamma Enna Aankutty.

In 2011, he played the central character in the road thriller film Traffic. The film's success and wide critical acclaim ushered in a trend that followed in Malayalam cinema, dubbed the New generation movies. This was followed by another film Seniors where for the first time he took on a negative role playing a criminal, which was commercial success at the box office and he won SIIMA Award for Best Actor in a Negative Role - Malayalam. In the same year he acted again in films like Three Kings, Sevens and Doctor Love. He also won the Youth Icon award at Asianet Film Awards.

In 2012, he was featured in three films, Lal Jose's Spanish Masala, Ordinary and Mallu Singh. In Spanish Masala he played a full-length negative role which had Dileep as main lead. Ordinary had a high opening at the Kerala box office and had 10,000 showings in theatres before reaching the 50-day mark.  Mallu Singh is credited as 50th film of Kunchacko Boban. Ordinary and Mallu Singh both films became major commercial success at the box office.

His started 2013 with comedy thriller Romans, which was a blockbuster at the box office and later, 3 Dots, God for Sale: Bhakthi Prasthanam, Kadhaveedu, Vishudhan, and Pullipulikalum Aattinkuttiyum, a commercial success.

Kunchacko Boban also gained critical acclaim for his performance, in films such as God for Sale: Bhakthi Prasthanam(2013), Vishudhan(2013), Kadhaveedu(2013), How Old Are You (2014), Madhura Naranga (2015), Valiya Chirakulla Pakshikal (2015) and Vettah (2016).

He was also a part of Valiya Chirakulla Pakshikal, directed by Dr. Biju, was an eye-opener on how the use of endosulfan affected Northern Kerala villages. The film was screened at the United Nations and was also selected for many world-famous film festivals including the Toronto Film Festival, New York Indian Film Festival, and International Film Festival of India. Valiya Chirakulla Pakshikal earned the national award for Best Film made on environmental preservation.

In 2016, Kunchacko revamped Udaya Pictures, the iconic Malayalam production house. Kochauvva Paulo Ayyappa Coelho marked his debut as a producer under this new film outfit.

The year 2017 saw three films, Take Off, Ramante Eden Thottam and Varnyathil Aashanka, earned him numerous accolades as a mature and versatile actor. Take Off was produced in memory of the late director Rajesh Pillai and earned several awards in State, National and International competitions.
The characters of these films earned him the Family Hero award at the Vanitha Film Awards and Best Actor critics award at the Asianet Film Awards. The film also happened to release on the 20th anniversary of his film debut Aniyathipravu.

He began 2018 with back-to-back successful films, Shikkari Shambhu, Kuttanadan Marpappa and Panchavarnathatha. His next two releases were Mangalyam Thanthunanena and Johny Johny Yes Appa. His final release of the year was Lal Jose's Thattumpurath Achuthan.

His releases of 2019 were comedy-thriller Allu Ramendran and a medical thriller  Virus. Allu Ramendran met with a positive response and was a commercial success. Virus received critical acclaim and was a major box office success of 2019. His performance in both films was highly praised. His first release of 2020 was crime thriller Anjaam Pathiraa, in which he played the central character, Anwar Hussain. The film received highly positive reviews and becomes the first blockbuster film of 2020 in Malayalam Film Industry. The film considered the highest-grossing Malayalam films of the year grossed ₹50 crores worldwide  and also the highest TRP rated Malayalam film of the year across all channels as well as Surya Tv's all-time biggest TRP rated film ever.

He started 2021 with three movies. Nayattu, which was released in theatres on 8 April, was critically acclaimed for showing the truth of the political circus. The movie was later released on Netflix.
The other two, Nizhal and 'Mohan Kumar Fans', were released on OTT platforms.'Mohan Kumar Fans' was praised for their effective blend of satire and emotional drama. He ended 2021 with Bheemante Vazhi, which saw a theatre release on December 3, 2021. After four weeks of theatrical run, the film was released in Amazon Prime Video on 30 December 2021.

He started 2022 with Political social-thriller film Pada. The film was released on 11 March 2022 and opened to highly positive reviews.

Filmography

Other works
Besides films and business, Kunchacko promotes social causes. In 2014 Kunchacko Boban, launched Celebrity Cricket Club (C3). He was the Chairman of the organisation C3, and a group of celebrities came together to pledge their time and effort for charity initiative. The club stands for cricket, charity and comradeship.

In 2015, he opened Al Fasht Medical Centre in Sharjah, a medical centre providing comparatively low-cost health care for child behaviour, autism, and adult psychiatry.

Television

Awards and nominations

References

External links 

 

Living people
Male actors from Alappuzha
Male actors in Malayalam cinema
Indian male film actors
Malayalam film producers
Film producers from Kerala
Syro-Malabar Catholics
Kerala State Film Award winners
20th-century Indian male actors
21st-century Indian male actors
People from Alappuzha district
Indian Christians
1976 births